Bill Burke (born October 15, 1969, in San Antonio, Texas) is a retired male middle distance runner from the United States, who competed in the 1980s and the early 1990s for his native country. He set his personal best in the men's 1,500 metres event (3:35.74) on 1993-08-01 at a meet in Cologne.

References

Profile

1969 births
Living people
American male middle-distance runners
Athletes (track and field) at the 1991 Pan American Games
Track and field athletes from San Antonio
Pan American Games medalists in athletics (track and field)
Pan American Games silver medalists for the United States
Universiade medalists in athletics (track and field)
Universiade silver medalists for the United States
Medalists at the 1993 Summer Universiade
Medalists at the 1991 Pan American Games